José Manuel Romay Beccaría (born 18 January 1934) is a Spanish lawyer and politician. During his political life, he has been regional minister in several occasions in the Regional Government of Galicia, Member of the Congress of Deputies and Senator. The highest and most important offices that he held were Health Minister of Spain and two times President of the Council of State.

Career
Born in Betanzos, Romay was trained as a lawyer at the University of Santiago de Compostela, where he later taught. He became a lawyer for the Spanish Council of State in 1959. Romay was first elected to the Congress of Deputies from A Coruña in 1982. He stepped down in 1990 after his second consecutive term to return to the Xunta de Galicia as an adviser and minister, in which he had first served as vice president between 1982 and 1983. Romay returned to the national government in 1996, accepting an appointment as health minister. 

In 2000, Romay began his second stint in the Congress of Deputies, again representing A Coruña. 

In 2002, he became president of the Council of State. He was succeeded by Francisco Rubio Llorente in 2004. Romay was appointed to the senate between 2011 and 2012 by the parliament of Galicia. That same year, Romay was named president of the Council of State for the second time.

References

1934 births
Living people
People from Betanzos
Members of the 2nd Congress of Deputies (Spain)
Members of the 3rd Congress of Deputies (Spain)
People's Alliance (Spain) politicians
People's Party (Spain) politicians
Health ministers of Spain
University of Santiago de Compostela alumni
Academic staff of the University of Santiago de Compostela
20th-century Spanish lawyers
Members of the Senate of Spain